The Commander of the Royal Brunei Armed Forces is the professional head of the Royal Brunei Armed Forces (RBAF).  He is responsible for the overall management, administration, and the operational control of the entire military of Brunei.  The current commander is Major general  Haji Muhammad Haszaimi bin Bol Hassan.

List of RBAF commanders

References

Military of Brunei
 
Brunei